Lebanese may refer to:

 Something of, from, or related to the Lebanese Republic
 Lebanese people, people from Lebanon or of Lebanese descent
 Lebanese Arabic, the colloquial form of Arabic spoken in Lebanon
 Lebanese culture
 Lebanese cuisine

See also 
 
 List of Lebanese people

Language and nationality disambiguation pages